The Sahalahti church village (also known as Sahalahti) is a village in the eastern part of the Kangasala town and former administrative center of the former Sahalahti municipality in Pirkanmaa, Finland. At the end of 2018, the village had 1,195 inhabitants. Right in the southern part of the village is Lake Kirkkojärvi.

The village's services include a wooden church designed in 1829 and designed by architect Carl Ludvig Engel, a parish center, a health center, a K-Market grocery store, a comprehensive school and a kindergarten. There is also a restaurant called Sahalahden Krouvi along regional road 325.

References

External links
 Sahalahti - Kangasala.fi (in Finnish)
 A map of Kangasala municipality (in Finnish)
 Kari Elkelä: Pankit ja puodit tulivat – useimmat myös menivät - Sydän-Hämeen Lehti (in Finnish)

Kangasala
Villages in Finland